Converse is a surname. Notable people with the surname include:
 Amasa Converse (1795-1872), American Presbyterian minister and newspaper editor
 Connie Converse (born 1924), American singer-songwriter
 Florence Converse (1871–1967), American author
 Frank Converse (born 1938), American actor
 Frederick Converse (1871–1940), American composer of classical music
 George A. Converse (1844–1909), United States Navy rear admiral
 George L. Converse (1827–1897), American politician, U.S. Representative from Ohio from 1879 to 1881
 Harriet Maxwell Converse (1836–1903), American author and folklorist
 Julius Converse (1798–1885), American politician, Governor of Vermont from 1872 to 1874
 Larry Converse, American politician, Democratic member of the New Hampshire House of Representatives from 2014 to 2016
 Marquis Mills Converse (1861–1931), American founder of the Converse Rubber Shoe Company
 Peggy Converse (1905–2001), American actress
 Philip Converse (1928-2014), American political scientist